Jiří Vršťala (31 July 1920 – 10 June 1999) was a Czech film actor. He appeared in more than fifty films from 1950 to 1987.

Selected filmography

References

External links
 

1920 births
1999 deaths
Actors from Liberec
Czechoslovak male actors
Czech male actors
Czech male film actors